The British Rail Class 331 Civity is a class of electric multiple unit built by CAF, owned by Eversholt Rail Group, and currently operated by Northern Trains. A total of 43 units have been built31 three-car units and 12 four-car units. Construction of the trains started in July 2017 and they were phased into service from 1 July 2019.

History
The announcement of the new trains was made by Arriva UK Trains when it was confirmed that it would become the next operator of the Northern franchise from 1 April 2016. CAF were selected by Arriva as they were the only manufacturer able to produce both new diesel and electric multiple units from the same platform, the Civity, thus increasing familiarity for drivers and reducing maintenance costs once in operation. Bombardier submitted a bid to produce electric units based on their new Aventra platform, but was unable to offer the matching DMU that Arriva required. Furthermore, Bombardier already had a long order book for Aventra units and Arriva believed CAF were in a stronger position to guarantee on-time delivery of the units. At the time of placing the order, the £500 million value and 101-unit size made it CAF's largest-ever contract for a European customer.

Construction started in July 2017, with the first completed unit being unveiled on 31 January 2018. Testing began in the UK in September 2018, and in March 2019, a four-car Class 331 unit (331111) became the first train to be completed at CAF's Llanwern factory.

On 28 June 2019, the new trains were launched by a special service for the media. Regular passenger service with the Class 331 (along with its diesel counterpart, the ) started on 1 July 2019.

Description

Arriva UK Trains stated its aim for a "step-change in quality" for the new trains when compared with older trains in the Northern fleet such as the Pacers and Sprinters. The interior, layout and driver cab of the Class 331 (EMU) are identical to their sister units, the Class 195 (DMU) with the only difference being power generation and drivetrain.

The units have air conditioning, power sockets, one toilet per train, open gangways between individual carriages, passenger compartment CCTV, provision for wheelchair passengers and wi-fi system. All trains fitted with an automated audio information system, as well as display screens  six in each carriage ensuring all passengers have an unobstructed view to at least one. These screens convey a variety of information from station arrival times and informing alighting passengers when they need to be in a different carriage due to platforms being too short to accommodate the train.

Northern selected a "wide and spacious" vestibule area to allow for quicker passenger flows when boarding and disembarking to minimise dwell times which can result in delays. These large spaces around the doors offer a degree of flexibility as to how this space can be used with flip-down seats and standing space in times of overcrowding where the objective is ensuring more passengers can board. The units are not fitted with fixed luggage racks as these often reduce capacity on peak-time commuter trains  space is provided around the flip-down seats adjacent to the doors to store luggage and prams  thus not impacting on the capacity of the train or safety for passengers wishing to alight or board.

The Class 331 electric units are noted for their quick acceleration putting them among the fastest accelerating EMUs in the United Kingdom with a rate of 1.3m/s2. It is envisaged this improved acceleration result in efficiencies and improved punctuality on commuter routes with multiple stops across the Northern network.

The units are designed with a projected lifespan of 35years and it is planned they will operate beyond 2050 with maintenance and refurbishment. Other features included are digital seat reservation systemhowever these are to future-proof the train and Northern do not envisage using these on many, if any routes. Although the vast majority of services will operate as three or four-car formations, some three-car units will be doubled up to form six-car services. As a result, they are fitted with Automatic Selective Door Operation (ASDO) for use on routes where station platform lengths are not sufficient to fully accommodate the train. This ASDO is linked to an automated system which informs the passengers through both announcements and the passenger information screens located in each saloon.

Routes
In West Yorkshire, the Class 331 units replaced the eight  and  trains operating alongside the fleet of  units on / to / and Leeds to  stopping services.

Named units
 331106 – Proud To Be Northern
 331110 – Proud To Be Northern

Fleet details

Vehicle numbering
Individual vehicles are numbered in the ranges as follows, with the last three digits of each vehicle number matching those of the unit to which the vehicle belongs:

European Vehicle Numbers for the fleet are devised by prefixing the domestic vehicle number with type code 94, country code 70, and a leading zero; "94700...".

Livery illustration

See also
 British Rail Class 195 - A diesel multiple unit variant of the CAF Civity UK platform also built for Northern.
 British Rail Class 196 - A diesel multiple unit variant of the CAF Civity UK platform built for West Midlands Trains.
 British Rail Class 197 - A diesel multiple unit variant of the CAF Civity UK platform being built for Transport for Wales Rail.
 British Rail Class 397 - An electric multiple unit variant of the CAF Civity UK platform built for TransPennine Express.

References

External links

331
CAF multiple units
Train-related introductions in 2019
25 kV AC multiple units